Tipu Sultan: The Tiger Lord is a 1997 Pakistani television series written by Khan Asif and directed by Qasim Jalali and produced by M. Hussain Khanzada.

Synopsis 
Tipu Sultan was the eldest son of Sultan Haider Ali and his mother's name was Fakhr-un-Nissa. Sultan Haider Ali names his son after a great Sufi saint namely Tipu Mastan Aulia. Tipu Sultan becomes the ruler of the Kingdom of Mysore.

Cast 
 Tahir Kazmi as Sultan Fateh Ali Tipu AKA Tipu Sultan
 Gulab Chandio as Purniya AKA Dewan of Mysore
 Javeria Saud as Sareeta
 Sikandar Shaheen as Sultan Haider Ali (Tipu's father)
 Ghazala Kaifee as Malka Fatima Fakhr-un-Nisa (Tipu's mother)
 K.U Khan as General Harris
 Fareeda Shabbir as Maharani Devi
 Tahira Wasti as Rani Lakshra
 Mishi Khan as Rukayya Bano (Tipu's wife)
 Subhani Ba Yunus as Nazim
 Ayesha Khan as Malka Begum Nizam (Nizam's Wife)
 Fazila Kaiser as Tajdar Begum (Tipu's wife)
 Nasir Jamal Khattak as Syed Ghaffar
 Ishrat Hashmi as Sareeta's mother
 Shamim-ul-Hassan as Mir Qasim

References

External links
 

1990s Pakistani television series
Pakistan Television Corporation original programming
Pakistani drama television series
Urdu-language television shows